"Go to Sleep" is a song by Radiohead.

Go to Sleep or Go 2 Sleep may also refer to:

 "Go to Sleep" (Lupe Fiasco song), 2012
 "Go to Sleep" (Loïc Nottet song), 2017
 "Go to Sleep", a song by Barbra Streisand from the film On a Clear Day You Can See Forever
 "Go to Sleep", a song by Eminem, DMX, and Obie Trice from the Cradle 2 the Grave film soundtrack album
 "Go to Sleep", an episode of the American children’s television series Bear in the Big Blue House
 "Go 2 Sleep",  a song by Ludacris from Word of Mouf
 "Go to Sleep", a song by Roxette from Crash! Boom! Bang!
 "Go to Sleep", a song by Sarah Harmer from All of Our Names
 Go to Sleep (wrestling),  a professional wrestling attack
 "Go to sleep", phrase said in the creepypasta story "Jeff the Killer"

See also
 "I Go to Sleep", a song by The Kinks, also covered by the Pretenders
 Go to Sleep Jeff!, a 2003 album by The Wiggles
 Go the Fuck to Sleep, a book by Adam Mansbach